A macula is a spot on the retina of the human eye.

Macula may also refer to:

Science and medicine
 Macula (archaeology), a feature visible on an aerial photograph but with no identifiable function
 Macula (planetary geology), a dark area on the surface of a planet or moon
 Macula of saccule, in the human ear
 Macula of utricle, in the human ear
 Macula adhaerens, a cell structure specialized for cell-to-cell adhesion
 Macula densa, a group of cells in the kidney that stain darker histologically

Species 
 Astylopsis macula, a beetle of family Cerambycidae
 Gibberula macula, a sea snail of family Cystiscidae
 Goniotorna macula, a moth of family Tortricidae
 Ortalotrypeta macula, a fruit fly of family Tephritidae
 Schrankia macula, a moth of family Erebidae
 Ulotrichopus macula, a moth of family Erebidae

Other uses
 Macula (footballer) (born 1968), Brazilian footballer
 A mortal sin in Catholicism